Santana may refer to:

Transportation
 Volkswagen Santana, an automobile
 Santana Cycles, manufacturer of tandem bicycles
 Santana Motors, a former Spanish automobile manufacturer

Boats
 Santana 20, an American sailboat design by W. D. Schock Corp
 Santana 21, an American sailboat design by W. D. Schock Corp
 Santana 22, an American sailboat design by W. D. Schock Corp
 Santana 23, an American sailboat design by W. D. Schock Corp
 Santana 25, an American sailboat design by W. D. Schock Corp
 Santana 27, an American sailboat design by W. D. Schock Corp
 Santana 30/30, an American sailboat design by W. D. Schock Corp
 Santana 37, an American sailboat design by W. D. Schock Corp
 Santana 39, an American sailboat design by W. D. Schock Corp
 Santana 2023, an American sailboat design by W. D. Schock Corp

People
 Carlos Santana (born 1947), Mexican-American rock guitarist
 Santana (chief) (–1876), chief of the Northern Mescalero Apache 1857–1876
 Carlos Santana (baseball) (born 1986), major league first baseman
 Santana (footballer) (1936–1989), Portuguese international footballer
 Santana Moss (born 1979), National Football League wide receiver on the Washington Redskins
 Santana Martinez, a Native American artist, daughter-in-law and collaborator of Maria Martinez
 Santana (surname), a list of people with the surname
 Mike Draztik, ring name Santana, a professional wrestler and a member of tag team Santana and Ortiz
 Santana Garrett (born 1988), American professional wrestler

Culture
 Santana, a fictional character in the story arc Battle Tendency from JoJo's Bizarre Adventure
 Santana Lopez, a fictional character on the TV series Glee
 Santana (film), a 2020 action film

Music
 Santana (band), rock band featuring guitarist Carlos Santana
 Santana (1969 album), the debut album of the band
 Santana (1971 album), third album of the band
 Santana IV, 2016, album of the band's classic lineup
 Santana Tour, 1969–1970, tour of the band

Places

Brazil
 Santana (district of São Paulo), a neighborhood of São Paulo
 Santana (São Paulo Metro), a station on the São Paulo Metro
 Santana, Rio Grande do Sul, neighbourhood in the city of Porto Alegre
 Santana, Amapá
 Santana, Bahia, Bahia
 Barra de Santana, Paraíba
 Campo de Santana, Paraíba
 Capela de Santana, Rio Grande do Sul
 Feira de Santana, Bahia
 Riacho de Santana, Bahia
 Riacho de Santana, Rio Grande do Norte
 Santana do Acaraú, Ceará
 Santana do Araguaia, Pará
 Santana da Boa Vista, Rio Grande do Sul
 Santana do Cariri, Ceará
 Santana de Cataguases, Minas Gerais
 Santana do Deserto, Minas Gerais
 Santana do Garambéu, Minas Gerais
 Santana dos Garrotes, Paraíba
 Santana do Ipanema, Alagoas
 Santana do Itararé, Paraná
 Santana do Jacaré, Minas Gerais
 Santana do Livramento, Rio Grande do Sul
 Santana de Mangueira, Paraíba
 Santana do Manhuaçu, Minas Gerais
 Santana do Maranhão, Maranhão
 Santana do Matos, Rio Grande do Norte
 Santana dos Montes, Minas Gerais
 Santana do Mundaú, Alagoas
 Santana do Paraíso, Rio Grande do Sul
 Santana de Parnaíba, São Paulo
 Santana do Piauí, Piauí
 Santana de Pirapama, Minas Gerais
 Santana da Ponte Pensa, São Paulo
 Santana do Riacho, Minas Gerais
 Santana do São Francisco, Sergipe
 Santana do Seridó, Rio Grande do Norte
 Santana da Vargem, Minas Gerais
 Sertão Santana, Rio Grande do Sul

Dominican Republic
 Ramón Santana, San Pedro de Macorís, municipality in the San Pedro de Macorís Province
 Santana, Baoruco, a municipal district in the Baoruco Province
 Santana, Peravia, Dominican Republic, a municipal district in the Peravia Province

Portugal
 Santana (Figueira da Foz), a civil parish in the municipality of Figueira da Foz
 Santana (Nisa), a civil parish in the municipality of Nisa
 Santana (Nordeste), a parish in the municipality of Nordeste in the Azores
 Santana (Portel), a parish in the municipality of Portel
 Santana, Madeira, a municipality on the island of Madeira
 Santana (Sesimbra), a village in the municipality of Sesimbra in Setúbal district, Portugal.

Puerto Rico
  Santana, Arecibo, Puerto Rico, a barrio
  Santana, Sabana Grande, Puerto Rico, a barrio

Romania
 Sântana, a town in Arad County, Romania
 Sântana de Mureș, a commune in Mureș County, Romania

Elsewhere
 Santana, Boyacá, municipality in the Boyacá Department
 Santana, São Tomé and Príncipe, town in the eastern coast of São Tomé Island
 Santana, Belize, village in the Belize District

Sports
 Santana Esporte Clube, a Brazilian football (soccer) club
 Santana FC, a football club in São Tomé and Príncipe

Other uses
 Santana Productions, a film production company founded by Humphrey Bogart
 Santana Formation, fossil accumulation in northeastern Brazil's Araripe Basin
 Santana High School, a secondary school in Santee, California, site of a 2001 shooting
 Dharma, also known as Santana, a notion of unity that replaces the idea of self in Buddhism

See also 
 Satanta (disambiguation)
 Setanta (disambiguation)
 Santa Ana (disambiguation)